Nathan Morgan (born 30 June 1978) is an English long jumper with a personal best of 8.26 metres. He is the former British record holder, but is currently third on the British all time long jump list, behind Chris Tomlinson and Greg Rutherford.

At the 2002 Commonwealth Games he was the only athlete to jump over eight meters with a jump of 8.02 m. This clinched him a gold medal.

International competitions

References

External links

1978 births
Living people
English male long jumpers
Commonwealth Games gold medallists for England
Athletes (track and field) at the 2002 Commonwealth Games
World Athletics Championships athletes for Great Britain
Commonwealth Games medallists in athletics
Medallists at the 2002 Commonwealth Games